Echinamoebidae is a family of Amoebozoa, containing the genera Echinamoeba and Filamoeba. It was established by Frederick Page in 1975.

Taxonomy
Family Echinamoebidae Page 1975
 Genus Comandonia Sawyer & Griffin 1975 ex Pernin & Pussard 1979
 Species C. operculata Sawyer & Griffin 1975 ex Pernin & Pussard 1979
 Genus Micriamoeba Atlan et al. 2012
 Species M. tesseris Atlan et al. 2012
 Genus Echinamoeba Page 1975
 Species E. exudans (Page 1967) Page 1975
 Species E. silvestris Page 1975
 Species E. thermarum Baumgartner et al. 2003

References

Amoebozoa families